Andrew Phillips was a Welsh Anglican priest.

Phillips was educated at the University of Oxford. He held livings at Llangathen, Christchurch and Coity. He was the Archdeacon of Brecon from 1578 to 1620.

References

Archdeacons of Brecon
16th-century Welsh Anglican priests
17th-century Welsh Anglican priests
Alumni of the University of Oxford
People from Brecknockshire